Alcockia is a genus in the cusk-eel family. This species grows to a length of  SL. The generic name Alcockia honours Alfred William Alcock (1859-1933) who was the surgeon-naturalist aboard the R.I.M.S. Investigator.

References

Ophidiidae
Monotypic ray-finned fish genera
Marine fish genera